The Liuzhou Locomotive Depot (Chinese:柳州机务段) is a locomotive depot that belongs to the Nanning Railway Bureau. It is located in Liuzhou and was founded in 1942.

Equipped models 

China Railways DF4B
China Railways DF4D(0000 Series and 3000 Series)
China Railways DF5
China Railways DF7G(0000 Series)
China Railways DF8B
China Railways DF11G
China Railways GKD1
China Railways HXN5B
China Railways SS3
China Railways SS3B
China Railways SS7
China Railways HXD3C

Dominated models 
China Railways DF4C
China Railways DF4D(4000 Series and 7000 Series)
China Railways HXD1D
China Railways HXD3D

Retired models 

China Railways DF
China Railways DF2
China Railways DF7D
China Railways DF10
China Railways FD
China Railways JS
China Railways JF
China Railways JF11
China Railways KD7
China Railways QJ
China Railways SL6

Subordinate Agencies 
Guilin Locomotive Area(Former Guilin Locomotive Depot)
Jinchengjiang Locomotive Area(Former Jinchengjiang Locomotive Depot)
Rong'an Locomotive Area(Former Rong'an Locomotive Depot)

See also
Nanning Locomotive Depot 
Liuzhou Railway Station

References

External links

 The microblog of the Liuzhou Locomotive Depot_Sina Weibo(Chinese)
 The microblog of the Liuzhou Locomotive Depot_Tencent Weibo(Chinese)

Rail transport in Guangxi
Buildings and structures in Liuzhou
Railway depots in China